Marques Oscar Green (born March 18, 1982) is an American-born naturalized Macedonian professional basketball player who last played for Pallacanestro Piacentina of the Italian Serie A2 Basket.

Career highlights
Green was graduated from the St. Bonaventure University in 2004. In his last year, he had averages of 19.4 points, 3.3 rebounds, 5.2 assists and 4.0 steals per game. After his graduation, he decided to continue his career in Europe and started to play for Chorale Roanne Basket of France in his first professional year.

One year later, he was signed by SLUC Nancy Basket where he averaged 9.9 points and 6.6 assists. Before playing for his current team, Air Avellino, he played in Turkey for CASA TED Kolejliler, where he scored more than 500 points in one season.

In August 2012, Green signed a one-year deal with Cedevita Zagreb. On January 2, 2013, he returned to Italy and signed a contract with Emporio Armani Milano till the end of the season.

On July 7, 2013, Green signed a one-year deal with Dinamo Sassari.

In August 2014, he signed with TED Ankara Kolejliler of Turkey. On March 13, 2015, he left Ankara and signed with his former team Scandone Avellino.

On November 29, 2017, he signed with Reyer Venezia. On January 18, 2018, he left Venezia and signed with Aurora Basket Jesi for the rest of the 2017–18 Serie A2 season.

National team
In 2010, he played two games for Macedonian national team in qualification for EuroBasket 2011. His average score was 3 points, 6.5 assists, and 3.5 steals.

Career

See also
 List of NCAA Division I men's basketball season steals leaders

References

External links
 TBLStat.net profile
 College stats

1982 births
Living people
ABA League players
American emigrants to North Macedonia
American expatriate basketball people in Croatia
American expatriate basketball people in France
American expatriate basketball people in Italy
American expatriate basketball people in Turkey
American men's basketball players
Basketball players from Pennsylvania
Chorale Roanne Basket players
Dinamo Sassari players
Fenerbahçe men's basketball players
KK Cedevita players
Lega Basket Serie A players
Macedonian people of African-American descent
Macedonian men's basketball players
Olimpia Milano players
People from Norristown, Pennsylvania
Point guards
Reyer Venezia players
S.S. Felice Scandone players
SLUC Nancy Basket players
Sportspeople from Montgomery County, Pennsylvania
St. Bonaventure Bonnies men's basketball players
TED Ankara Kolejliler players
Victoria Libertas Pallacanestro players